The qualification tournaments for the 2022 BAL season, also known as the Road to BAL 2022, were the qualification rounds for the second season of the Basketball Africa League (BAL). The tournaments began on 19 October 2021 and ended 16 December 2021. Similar to the first season, the competition consisted out of two stages: the first round and the elite 16. Six teams advanced to the group phase of the BAL.

Teams
On 13 October 2021, FIBA announced the 26 teams from 26 countries which participate in the qualification round.
1st, 2nd, etc.: ranking in national leagues
CW: Cup winner

Notes

Withdrawing teams 
Six teams were drawn in a group for the first round, but withdrew prior to the start of the games.

First round
The first two teams of each group advance to the elite 16 and two wild cards will be given to teams from each division.

West Division

Group A 
Initially, four teams were drawn in Group A, which was played in Conakry, Guinea. However, Prédio and WA Boufarik failed to travel to Conakry.
<onlyinclude>

Group B 
Venue: Conakry, Guinea
<onlyinclude>

Group C 
Group C was hosted in Yaoundé, Cameroon. FAP, who play in the 2021 regular season, returned while Tondema and Espoir Fukash made their debuts in the competition. Malabo Kings forfeited the last day.
<onlyinclude>

East Division
Because Hawassa City and ASCUT of Group D withdrew, the groups were divided again. New Star was moved to Group D.

Group D
Venue: Dar es Salaam, Tanzania
<onlyinclude>

Group E
Venue: Dar es Salaam, Tanzania
<onlyinclude>

Group F
The venue of Group F was the Inzibio Hall in Soweto, Johannesburg, South Africa. Five teams were placed in this group, however, Mercenaries pulled out before the start. The Cape Town Tigers and Roche-Bois Warriors made their debut in the international level. The Group featured two former NBA players in Ben Uzoh and Billy Preston, who both played with Cape Town.
<onlyinclude>

Elite 16
In the elite 16, two groups of eight teams will be created consisting of the top two teams and wild cards of the first round. AS Salé, as the national champions of Morocco, directly enters this stage. Competition will begin on 02 December 2021 (Division East) in Johannesburg and 11 December 2021 (Division West) in Yaounde. The top three teams from each group advance to the 2022 BAL season. 

On 20 November 2021, the draw was held in Abidjan. On 11 December, FIBA announced ASPAC had withdrawn and AS Salé was not available.

Division West

Group G1

Group G2

Final stage

Semi-finals

Third place game

Final

Division East
The Division East games were played from 6 December until 11 December at the Wembley Stadium in Johannesburg, South Africa.

Group H1

Group H2

Final stage

Semi-finals

Third place game
The third place game was supposed to be played on 11 December 2021, however, the game was cancelled after six players tested positive on COVID-19 hours before the tip-off. It was a later announced that Cape Town qualified as New Star was forced to forfeit.

Final

Statistics
The following were the statistical leaders in the qualification games.

Individual statistic leaders

Individual game highs

Notes

References

2022 Q
Qualifiers
2021 in African basketball
2021–22 in basketball leagues